Laval-Links is a disused commuter rail station formerly operated by Canadian National Railways and the STCUM   in Laval, Quebec, Canada. It was located at milepost 17 on CN's Deux-Montagnes subdivision.

It was served by the Deux-Montagnes line.

Origin of name
The name comes from the nearby Club Laval-sur-le-Lac golf course, aka Laval Links.

Location
In the Laval-sur-le-Lac sector of Laval at the corner of rue les Cèdres, the entrance of the links, and rue les Peupliers.

Connecting bus routes 
Until 1995 STL route 26 on nearby rue les Érables.

See also 
 Laval-sur-le-Lac Golf Club

References

External links

Former Exo commuter rail stations
Railway stations in Laval, Quebec